The Taipei Metro Wanlong station (formerly transliterated as Wanlung Station until 2003) is a station on the Songshan–Xindian line located in Wenshan District, Taipei, Taiwan. It was a former station of the now-defunct Xindian Line of the Taiwan Railways Administration.

Station overview
This two-level, underground station, has an island platform and four exit.

Station layout

Exits
Exit 1: Roosevelt Rd. Sec. 5 and Roosevelt Rd. Sec. 5 Lane 236
Exit 2: Roosevelt Rd. Sec. 5
Exit 3: Roosevelt Rd. Sec. 5 and Roosevelt Rd. Sec. 5 Lane 211
Exit 4: Roosevelt Rd. Sec. 5 and Roosevelt Rd. Sec. 5 Lane 212

Around the station
 Taipei Pot Plant Auction
 Wenshan Jingmei Sports Park
 Xizhou Riverside Park

References

Railway stations opened in 1999
1999 establishments in Taiwan
Songshan–Xindian line stations